Aishwarya Vidhya Raghunath is an accomplished Carnatic music vocalist. She is among the foremost and popular young performing classical musicians in India. Hailing from a family of music connoisseurs, Aishwarya was initiated into the world of music at the age of three. She is an "A" grade artiste of All India Radio and Doordarshan.

Music career
Aishwarya gave her first concert was at the age of thirteen. She has since travelled and performed across India and overseas to enthrall her listeners.

Aishwarya has the honour of being the disciple of musical stalwarts - Sangita Kalaacharya Smt (Late) Seethalakshmi Venkatesan, Padma Bhushan Sri P. S. Narayanaswamy and Sangeetha Kalasagaram Smt Vegavahini Vijayaraghavan, thus being an upholder of the Semmangudi bhani and the Veena Dhanammal bhani.

Aishwarya’s style combines classicism and spontaneity, laced with a touch of elegance, and is known for its purity and clarity. Her mellifluous voice and clear tones have always captivated audiences. Her concerts are marked by aesthetic grace, built around a planned approach.

Awards
 "Best Concert Prize (2015)", from The Music Academy, Chennai. 
 "DK Pattammal Award (2015)", from Karthik Fine Arts, Chennai. 
 "Best Concert Prize (2014)", from The Music Academy, Chennai.
 "MS Subbulakshmi Award (2014)", from Narada Gana Sabha, Chennai.
 "Best Performer, 2013", from Sri Parthasarathy Swamy Sabha, Chennai.
 "Meena Srinivasan Award", from the Indo-Canadian Shastri Foundation.
 "Best Vocalist" award by Ramana Kendra, Chennai.
 "Sirkazhi Govindarajan Award" from Krishna Gana Sabha, Chennai.
 "RMKV Award of Excellence", by Rasika Fine Arts, Chennai.
 "Best Vocalist" from the Bangalore Gayana Samaja.
 "Yagnaraman Endowment Prize" from Krishna Gana Sabha, Chennai.
 "Rising Young Talent" by the Bangalore Rotarians.
 Winner of the All India Radio competition. 
 Recipient of the scholarship by the Ministry of Culture (India).

Education
Aishwarya holds a B.E. degree in biotechnology from P.E.S. Institute of Technology, Bangalore. She worked as an executive in the biotechnology industry. In an interview, she stated "I realized that while I did love biotechnology, music was really my calling, and that I would do injustice if I did not invest the right amount of time and energy in it. Music, like any other profession, is a full-time job and requires a lot of thought and mind space as a performing art".

References

Other news reviews and articles

External links
Interview at KnowYourStar.com 

Women Carnatic singers
Carnatic singers
Living people
Year of birth missing (living people)
Place of birth missing (living people)
Indian women classical singers
Singers from Bangalore
Women musicians from Karnataka
21st-century Indian women singers
21st-century Indian singers